WIS TV Tower is a  guy-wired aerial mast for the transmission 
of FM radio and television programs in Lugoff, South Carolina, U.S. 
().
WIS TV Tower was built in 1958, replacing the original 1953 tower. When the 1958 tower was built by Kline Iron and Steel of Columbia, S.C.,  it was the "highest man-made structure east of the Mississippi," and allowed WIS-TV to increase its coverage area from 29 counties to 41 counties.

See also
 WIS (TV)
 List of masts

References

External links
 

Radio masts and towers in the United States
Towers in South Carolina
1958 establishments in South Carolina
Towers completed in 1958
Buildings and structures in Kershaw County, South Carolina